Evan Alex Cole (born February 2, 1985) is an American actor. He played Hunter on the American daytime drama As the World Turns.

Born and raised in Atlanta, Georgia, Cole graduated from Carnegie Mellon University in 2008.  He received his DMD from The Dental College of GA at Augusta University.

Filmography
 She's Out of My League (2010) as Scotty Reese
 As the World Turns (2009–2010) as Lyon Hunter
 Adventureland  (2009) as  Prepster Friend
 Law & Order: Criminal Intent (2008) Peter Bottner
 Back When We Were Grownups (2004) as Dixon
 Joan of Arcadia (2003) as  Dax Hibbing

External links

American male soap opera actors
American male television actors
Living people
1985 births
Carnegie Mellon University alumni